Bamboo processing machines are used to prepare bamboo for use in manufacture of handicrafts, furniture and other products.

Bamboo processing tasks 
Bamboo processing machines are usually built to perform a single task such as:
 Splitting - separating the material in the direction of the fibers at right angles to the surface (radially)
 Slicing - separating the material in the direction of the fibers parallel to the surface (tangentially)
 Knot removing - cutting or grinding down the  inter-segmental nodes.
 Planing - smoothing the top, bottom and/or side surfaces of a split length
 Cross cutting - cutting a length of stem into shorter sections
 Incense stick making
 Stick sizing 
 Polishing
 Curving

Multi-task processing machines
A new machine developed in Nagaland, India performs four tasks on a single platform – planing, curving, polishing and knot removing. It was recognized by the National Innovation Foundation – India in their fifth biennial competition.

References 

Processing machine
Industrial machinery